John McCoy may refer to:

John McCoy (musician) (born c. 1950), British bass guitarist
John McCoy (Irish politician) (born 1940), Irish Progressive Democrats politician 1987–1989
John B. McCoy (born 1943), CEO Banc One Corporation
John Calvin McCoy (1811–1889), founder of Kansas City, Missouri
John W. McCoy (1910–1989), American artist
Jack McCoy (John James McCoy), fictional district attorney in the television drama Law & Order
John McCoy (American politician) (born 1943), American Indian Washington State Senator
John E. McCoy, United States National Guard general